János Fusz (Johann Evangelist Fuss) (15 June, baptised on the 16th 1777 in Tolna, Hungary – 9 March 1819), aged 41, was a Hungarian composer. Although he composed in many different genres, he was highly popular during his lifetime for his many songs, earning recognition from Beethoven among others.

He also composed a Quartet for flute, viola, cello and guitar.

Recordings
German songs – Maria Zadori (soprano) Timothy Bentch (tenor), accompanied by Aniko Horvath on fortepiano, Hungaroton 2006

References

https://web.archive.org/web/20070519173536/http://www.magyarzenetortenet.hu/er/erfj01.html

External links

 

1777 births
1819 deaths
Classical-period composers
Hungarian classical composers
Hungarian male classical composers
Hungarian conductors (music)
Male conductors (music)
People from Tolna County
18th-century classical composers
18th-century male musicians
18th-century musicians
18th-century conductors (music)
18th-century Hungarian people
19th-century classical composers
19th-century conductors (music)
19th-century Hungarian people